The 1998 North Dakota Fighting Sioux football team, also known as the Nodaks, was an American football team that represented the University of North Dakota as a member of the North Central Conference (NCC) during the 1998 NCAA Division II football season. Led by Roger Thomas in his 13th and final year as head coach, the Fighting Sioux compiled an overall record of 8–3 with a mark of 7–2 in conference play, placing third in the NCC. The team played home game at Memorial Stadium in Grand Forks, North Dakota.

Schedule

1999 NFL Draft

References

North Dakota
North Dakota Fighting Hawks football seasons
North Dakota Fighting Sioux football